Nemanja Milić (born 25 May 1990) is a Serbian professional footballer who plays as a winger for Mladost GAT.

Club career

OFK Beograd
Born in Sombor, Milić started his career with OFK Beograd, where he passed youth categories. He made his senior debut for the club during the 2006–07 Serbian SuperLiga season, as one of the academy players with the best prospects. After he spent the next season playing with youth team, Milić joined the first team of OFK Beograd in the 2008–09 Serbian SuperLiga season. At the beginning of 2009, Milić was scouted by Liverpool. For his first senior season, Milić made 26 appearances in all competitions including two matches in the UEFA Intertoto Cup. He scored his first senior goal on 23 May 2009 in away match against Borac Čačak. In the 2009–10 season, Milić scored 6 goals on 20 SuperLiga caps. Scoring 4 goals on 28 matches in all competitions for the 2010–11 season, he was related with Aston Villa in autumn 2011. Previously, he scored both goals in 2–0 victory against Jagodina in 2nd fixture match of the 2011–12 Serbian SuperLiga season, entering the game as a substitution. Milić collected 11 more games, but without goals for the rest of that season. Milić also scored 2 goals in the first half of the 2012–13 season, against Radnički Niš in the SuperLiga, and against Sloga Kraljevo in the Serbian Cup match. After many injury problems, Milić missed the whole spring half-season and left the club in summer 2013 as a free agent.

Spartak Subotica
In July 2013, Milić joined Hajduk Kula at the first, but later moved and signed a deal with Spartak Subotica. During the first season with new club, Milić made 16 league and 5 cup appearances and scored 1 goal. Scoring 7 league goals on 26 SuperLiga matches, he promoted himself as the best scorer of Spartak Subotica for the 2014–15 season. In the 2015–16 Serbian SuperLiga season, coach Andrey Chernyshov paired Milić with Ognjen Mudrinski in attack. During the first half of 2016–17, Milić was mostly used second striker, scoring 6 SuperLiga goals. Ending of 2016, he was elected for the best player of Spartak Subotica and the best footballer of Sombor, who performs in the Serbian SuperLiga.

Red Star Belgrade
On 10 January 2017, Milić signed three-and-a-half year contract with Red Star Belgrade. He made his debut for new club on 25 February 2017, replacing Srđan Plavšić in second-half of a match against Bačka Bačka Palanka. Milić started his first match on the field in a 27 fixture match of the 2016–17 Serbian SuperLiga season against Čukarički, instead of injured John Jairo Ruiz. Several days later, Milić was a scorer in a friendly match against Spartak Moscow, played at the Rajko Mitić Stadium. Milić scored his first goal for the club in a regular game in 4–2 victory against Mladost Lučani.

BATE Borisov
On 28 December 2018, Milić signed a three-year contract with FC BATE Borisov in a €300,000 transfer from Red Star Belgrade.

Career statistics

Club

Honours

Club
Red Star Belgrade
Serbian SuperLiga: 2017–18

References

External links
 
 
 
 

1990 births
Living people
People from Apatin
Sportspeople from Sombor
Serbian footballers
Serbia youth international footballers
Serbia under-21 international footballers
Association football forwards
Serbian expatriate footballers
Expatriate footballers in Belarus
Serbian SuperLiga players
FK Spartak Subotica players
OFK Beograd players
Red Star Belgrade footballers
FC BATE Borisov players